2005 Hong Kong–Shanghai Cup was the last set of Hong Kong-Shanghai Cup.

Shanghai Shenhua won Kitchee 1–0.

Result

References
  上海申花一球力壓傑志奪港滬盃冠軍

Hong Kong
Shan
Hong Kong–Shanghai Inter Club Championship
Hong Kong–Shanghai Cup